Arthur Edwards  (born 12 August 1940), is a British photographer, working for The Sun newspaper, who specialises in pictures of the British royal family, with whom he has toured often.

Early life and education 
Edwards was born in August 1940, and educated at St Bernard's Catholic Grammar School, Stepney, London. His mother worked as a cleaner and bought him his first camera, after saving from her wages.

He joined The Sun in 1977, and has been with them ever since.

He appeared as a castaway on the BBC Radio programme Desert Island Discs on 25 September 2011.

Edwards was made a Member of the Order of the British Empire (MBE) for "outstanding service to newspapers" and was awarded an honorary doctorate by Anglia Ruskin University in 2012.

Bibliography

References

External links 

 
 

Living people
1940 births
Place of birth missing (living people)
Members of the Order of the British Empire
Photographers from London
The Sun (United Kingdom) people
British royal family